Gypsy may refer to any of the several languages of the Gypsies:

The various Romani languages of Europe
The Para-Romani languages descending from them
The Domari language of the Mideast
The Seb Seliyer language of Iran
The Lomavren language of Armenia